The Men's team sprint cross-country skiing competition at the 2006 Winter Olympics in Turin, Italy, was held on 14 February, at Pragelato. This was the first time the team sprint was contested in the Winter Olympics. Each race featured teams of two, with each skier completing 3 laps of a 1325-metre course.

Norway, with Tore Ruud Hofstad and Tor Arne Hetland, had won the competition at the 2005 Nordic skiing World Championship, the only time it had been skied in the World Championship prior to the Turin games, but that was in free technique. The most recent team sprint event in classic technique had been in Canmore, Canada, on 18 December 2004. Jens Arne Svartedal and Eldar Rønning won that race for Norway's first team. However, despite this good Norwegian record, it was the Sweden's Thobias Fredriksson and Björn Lind who pipped Norway to the title.

Results

Semifinals
Fifteen teams were entered in the two semifinals, with the top five in each advancing to the final.

Semifinal 1

Semifinal 2

Final

The top three teams separated themselves from the pack fairly easily, with Sweden finishing just 0.6 seconds ahead of Norway to take the gold medal.

References

Men's cross-country skiing at the 2006 Winter Olympics
Men's team sprint cross-country skiing at the Winter Olympics